Ambroise Rendu may refer to:
 Ambroise Rendu (educator)
 Ambroise Rendu (politician)